The Dodge County School District is a public school district in Dodge County, Georgia, United States, based in Eastman. It serves the communities of Chauncey, Chester, Eastman, Milan, and Rhine.

History
In December 1977 Dahl McDermitt was second place in a special election to be the superintendent, with 2,069 votes, while E. M. "Pete" McDuffie, previously a member of the Georgia Senate, got 2,176 votes. Another candidate got 1,552 votes. McDuffie dropped out of the race, and in a runoff election in January 1978, McDermitt won, taking 3,209 votes while his opponent, the third place holder from the 1977 special election, had 2,834 votes. More than half of the eligible voters had voted in the runoff.

Schools
The Dodge County School District has a pre-K center, two elementary schools, one middle school, and one high school.

Elementary schools
Dodge Pre-K
North Dodge Elementary School
South Dodge Elementary School

Middle school
Dodge County Middle School

High school
Dodge County High School

References

External links

Old Eastman School historical marker

School districts in Georgia (U.S. state)
Education in Dodge County, Georgia